Tiah is a given name. Notable people with the name include:

 Tiah Delaney (born 1985), Australian model, presenter, and writer
 Tiah Haynes (born 1993), Australian rules footballer

See also
 Miah
 Tia (name)

Feminine given names